Bucculatrix needhami is a moth in the family Bucculatricidae. It was first described in 1956 by Annette Frances Braun. It is found in North America, where it has been recorded from Florida, Kentucky, Illinois, Maine, New York, Ohio, South Carolina and Texas.

The wingspan is 13–15 mm. The forewings are white marked with irrorated fuscous streaks. The hindwings are pale grey. Adults are on wing from March to July.

The larvae feed on Helianthus species. 
They create a gall, which has the form of a thickening of the walls of the stem. It varies in form from oblong to almost round. Galls mostly occur singly on the stems and are generally located somewhat below mid-height of the plant.

References

Natural History Museum Lepidoptera generic names catalog

Bucculatricidae
Moths described in 1956
Moths of North America
Taxa named by Annette Frances Braun